NDIS may refer to:
National Disability Insurance Scheme, Australia's disability support service scheme
Network Driver Interface Specification, in computing, an application programming interface for network interface cards
National DNA Index System, an American interstate DNA database